The government of Uxue Barkos was formed on 23 July 2015, following the latter's election as President of the Government of Navarre by the Parliament of Navarre on 20 July and her swearing-in on 22 July, as a result of Geroa Bai (GBai) being able to muster a majority of seats in the Parliament together with EH Bildu and Izquierda-Ezkerra (I–E), with external support from Podemos, following the 2015 Navarrese regional election.

The cabinet comprised members of GBai—with the involvement of Zabaltzen (ZBN) and the Basque Nationalist Party (EAJ/PNV)—EH Bildu and I–E (represented in the cabinet by United Left of Navarre, IUN/NEB), as well as a number of independents proposed by the first two parties. It was automatically dismissed on 27 May 2019 as a consequence of the 2019 regional election, but remained in acting capacity until the next government was sworn in.

Investiture

Cabinet changes
Barkos's government saw a number of cabinet changes during its tenure:
On 7 September 2016, it was announced tha the functions of the Spokesperson of the Government would be detached from the Citizen and Institutional Relations ministry, appointing María Solana to the post with the rank of director-general.
On 11 April 2017, José Luis Mendoza announced his resignation as Minister of Education, with the post being assumed by the Spokesperson, María Solana.

Council of Government
The Council of Government was structured into the offices for the president, the two vice presidents and nine ministries.

Departmental structure
Uxue Barkos's government was organised into several superior and governing units, whose number, powers and hierarchical structure varied depending on the ministerial department.

Unit/body rank
() Director-general
() Service

Notelist

References

2015 establishments in Navarre
2019 disestablishments in Navarre
Cabinets established in 2015
Cabinets disestablished in 2019
Cabinets of Navarre